A case of some merchandise is a collection of items packaged together.  A case is not a strict unit of measure. For consumer foodstuff such as canned goods, soda, cereal, and such, a case is typically 24 items, however cases may range from 12 to 36, typically in multiples of six. For larger bottles such as gallon jugs, a case is typically 4.

Examples
The standard case for  bottles of soda and Powerade contains 15 bottles due to their peculiar shape and size. 
Cases of video tape are typically packed 10 to a case. 
A case of wine contains 12 bottles of  each.

Book manufacture

The term case binding in the book manufacturing industry refers to a collection of pages contained in a case which is attached to it. (There are also cases for books e.g. slipcases which merely enclose a book.) The original case is often now called simply the binding, although the integrated manufacturing process still uses the term case to refer to the hard cover and spine.

See also
 Box
 Carton
 Crate
 Packaging
Fast-moving consumer goods

References

 Yam, K.L., "Encyclopedia of Packaging Technology", John Wiley & Sons, 2009, 

Goods (economics)